Toya is a village and seat of the commune of Alafia in the Cercle of Timbuktu in the Tombouctou Region of Mali. The village sits on the northern bank of the River Niger.

References

Populated places in Tombouctou Region